Helene Walsh is an American politician and former Republican member of the Illinois House of Representatives. She represented the 51st district via an appointment in August 2018 to replace the outgoing State Representative Nick Sauer. The 51st district includes all or parts of Barrington, Deer Park, Forest Lake, Green Oaks, Hawthorn Woods, Kildeer, Lake Barrington, Lake Zurich, Libertyville, Long Grove, Mundelein and North Barrington.

Mary Edly-Allen, a teacher from Libertyville, defeated Walsh in the 2018 general election.

Walsh is married to the former Congressman Joe Walsh. She has sat on the advisory board of Project HOOD for five years, the Haym Solomon Center board of directors since 2017, and is the COO of Leenie Productions.

References

External links 
Representative Helene Miller Walsh (R) 51st District at the Illinois General Assembly
100th

Occidental College alumni
Living people
Republican Party members of the Illinois House of Representatives
21st-century American politicians
People from Highland Park, Illinois
Year of birth missing (living people)